Bamako Sign Language, also known as Malian Sign Language, or LaSiMa (Langue des Signes Malienne), is a sign language that developed outside the Malian educational system, in the urban tea-circles of Bamako where deaf men gathered after work. It is used predominantly by men, and is threatened by the educational use of American Sign Language, which is the language of instruction for those deaf children who go to school.

See also
Tebul Sign Language, village sign of the Dogon region

References

External links
Sign languages of Mali
Sample signs of LaSiMa
Project LaSiMa (YouTube)
Bamako and Dogon sign languages at the University of Central Lancashire

Sign language isolates
Sign languages of Mali